Redding is a village within the Falkirk council area in Central Scotland.

At the time of the 2001 census, Redding had a population of 1,954 residents.

History

On a hill beyond Redding is a stone that is called Wallace's stone, marking out the spot from which Sir William Wallace, after his quarrel with Sir John Stuart, one of the Scottish chiefs, is said to have viewed the Battle of Falkirk, from which he had been compelled to retire, and to have witnessed the defeat of the Scottish army. The village is one of the older settlements in the area and is shown on Timothy Pont's map of Stirlingshire from around 1590.

In 1923, the small mining community of Redding was the scene of one of the worst disasters in the history of the Scottish coalfield, which claimed the lives of 40 men. At 5.00am on Tuesday 25 September 1923 an inrush of water flooded the pit. The Sir William Wallace Lodge of the Grand Lodge of Scotland Free Colliers still march every year on the first Saturday in August in memory of the men who lost their lives in the disaster.

See also
Falkirk Braes villages
List of places in Falkirk council area

References

External links

Redding Pit Disaster
Free Colliers

Villages in Falkirk (council area)
Mining communities in Scotland
1923 disasters in the United Kingdom